28th NSFC Awards
January 3, 1994

Best Film: 
 Schindler's List 
The 28th National Society of Film Critics Awards, given on 3 January 1994, honored the best filmmaking of 1993.

Winners

Best Picture 
1. Schindler's List
2. The Piano
3. Short Cuts

Best Director 
1. Steven Spielberg – Schindler's List
2. Jane Campion – The Piano
3. Robert Altman – Short Cuts

Best Actor 
1. David Thewlis – Naked
2. Daniel Day-Lewis – In the Name of the Father
2. Anthony Hopkins – The Remains of the Day and Shadowlands

Best Actress 
1. Holly Hunter – The Piano
2. Ashley Judd – Ruby in Paradise
3. Stockard Channing – Six Degrees of Separation

Best Supporting Actor 
1. Ralph Fiennes – Schindler's List
2. Leonardo DiCaprio – What's Eating Gilbert Grape and This Boy's Life
2. Tommy Lee Jones – The Fugitive

Best Supporting Actress 
1. Madeleine Stowe – Short Cuts
2. Gwyneth Paltrow – Flesh and Bone
3. Jennifer Jason Leigh – Short Cuts
3. Anna Paquin – The Piano

Best Screenplay 
1. Jane Campion – The Piano
2. John Guare – Six Degrees of Separation
3. Robert Altman and Frank Barhydt – Short Cuts

Best Cinematography 
1. Janusz Kamiński – Schindler's List
2. Stuart Dryburgh – The Piano
3. Michael Ballhaus – The Age of Innocence

Best Foreign Language Film 
1. The Story of Qiu Ju (Qiu Ju da guan si)
2. Blue (Trois couleurs: Bleu)
3. Farewell My Concubine (Ba wang bie ji)

Best Documentary 
1. Visions of Light
2. It's All True: Based on an Unfinished Film by Orson Welles
3. The War Room

Experimental Film 
Rock Hudson's Home Movies

Special Citation 
The filmmakers of It's All True: Based on an Unfinished Film by Orson Welles

References

External links
Past Awards

1993
National Society of Film Critics Awards
National Society of Film Critics Awards
National Society of Film Critics Awards